The Kildare Hotel and Golf Club (abbreviated The K Club) is a golf and leisure complex in the Republic of Ireland, located at Straffan, County Kildare. It is built on the original grounds of the Straffan estate, incorporating the 1830s Straffan House, and was owned by Michael Smurfit.

History
In 1831, Hugh Barton of the wine firm Barton and Guestier bought land at Straffan and nearby Barberstown Castle from the Henry family and had Straffan House built whilst he and his wife stayed at Barberstown. Completed in 1832, the design was based on a French chateau, with the later addition of a bell-tower, and now forms the east wing of the present complex. From Hugh the property passed, via his eldest son Nathaniel, to his eldest son Hugh Lynedoch, after which it passed to Hugh Lynedoch's brother, Bertram Francis. All served in turn as High Sheriff of Kildare. The estate remained in the Barton family until 1949, when Derick Barton was forced to sell the property to manufacturer John Ellis.

Following a succession of different owners, including film producer Kevin McClory, property developer Patrick Gallagher and property magnate Alan Ferguson, the house was purchased in 1988 by the Jefferson Smurfit Group and transformed into the K Club, which opened three years later. Gannon and Smurfit privately purchased the K Club in 2005, following the sale of Jefferson Smurfit to Madison Dearborn Partners and its subsequent merger with Kappa Packaging. In 2012, Michael Smurfit bought the 49% stake Gerry Gannon owned, through the NAMA for a reported 40 million euro.

The K Club is one of only four Irish 5-red-star hotels (as rated by The Automobile Association).

Restaurant
The Barton Restaurant is a quality restaurant that was awarded one Michelin star both in 1993 en 1994. The star was earned by head chef Michel Flamme.

Golf
The hotel complex also contains two golf courses, both designed by Arnold Palmer. The Palmer North Course was the venue for the Ryder Cup in 2006, the first time the event had been staged in Ireland. The course also hosted the Smurfit European Open on the European Tour from 1995 to 2003 and again in 2005, with that tournament being played on the resort's "inland links" Palmer South Course in 2004, 2006, and 2007. The Palmer North Course hosted the Irish Open in 2016, won by Rory McIlroy.

Gallery

References

External links

Golf clubs and courses in the Republic of Ireland
Golf in County Kildare
Sports venues in County Kildare
Hotels in County Kildare
Ryder Cup venues
Michelin Guide starred restaurants in Ireland
Sports clubs in County Kildare
Irish Open (golf) venues
Sports venues completed in 1991
1991 establishments in Ireland